The Ana G. Méndez University (UAGM) is a private university system with its main campus in San Juan, Puerto Rico that participates in the Puerto Rico Space Grant Consortium.

Campuses
The Ana G. Méndez University system has campuses in the following cities in Puerto Rico and mainland United States.

On January 2, 2019, the institution announced the transformation of the vessel —as Ana G. Méndez called it— from a university system into a system of universities. The independent units encompassing the original structure including the Universidad Metropolitana, Universidad del Turabo and Universidad del Este were merged into a single university of campuses to form Universidad Ana G. Méndez.  Since then, the university has progressively being leaping forward in expanses, as in the milestone of becoming the first institution in Puerto Rico to offer the degree of «veterinarii medicinae doctor» —doctor of veterinary medicine— through the School of Veterinary Medicine.

The university also transmits over the air across the broadband via WMTJ (PSIP virtual channel 40, ultra high frequency digital channel 15), a Public Broadcasting Service (PBS) television station.  The satellite communications transmission of WMTJ carriers over the spectrum with the call sign WQTO (PSIP virtual channel 26, ultra high frequency digital channel 19), transmitting at an Effective Radiated Power of six hundred ninety-six kilo lumens or Watts.  Sistema television studios for  «transmitting the good» are located at Rio Piedras in San Juan with the call sign's acronym standing for Méndez Television San Juan.

Gurabo campus
The Gurabo campus, usually referred to as "el Turabo," consists of two central campuses —main and Navarro— alongside a series of island-wide satellite campuses. The university also hosts a comprehensive sports programme complete with its respective gymnasia, weight room, track & field arena,  swimming pool, baseball fields, tennis complex, basketball and volleyball courts, and a series of fountains and gardens to elevate enlightenment to the fullest —“Había sequía en el Turabo y ahora se acabó la sequía. Ganamos”. The campus' academic offering is organized across seven academic divisions:

 Liberal Arts
 Health Sciences
 Science and Technology
 Engineering, Design & Architecture
 Naturopathic Medicine
 Veterinary Medicine
 Business, Tourism & Entrepreneurship

Museums and libraries
The central university library is located at the main campus in Abelardo Díaz Alfaro Hall.  It hosts the campus' central repository and circulation of information both analogue and digital, distributed over the structure with two computing centres spanning the main floor.  The Vice-chancellorship of Information Resources is located on the building's upper east side, the stairways leading to the top floor midway canvasing the entire width and wide reflecting the history culture and soul of Cariba's society.  Also on the upper floor there are five special collections reading rooms altogether encompassing:  The Edgardo Rodríguez Juliá Room, Francisco Manrique Cabrera Room, García Passalacqua-Acosta Room, Ivonne Acosta Lespier Room, and José Luis González Room.  From time to time, Abelardo Díaz Alfaro Hall propagates its walls with exhibitions from faculty and students alike.  The works of David Méndez Pagán, the current rector, have been exhibited in Abelardo Díaz Alfaro's hall.

There is a library-museum named after the former governor of Puerto Rico, Pedro Rosselló, as "Biblioteca Museo Dr. Pedro Rosselló", which includes a museum, library, studying area, and an auditorium.  Of the most memorable items curated at the museum is the Governor's laptop, on whose keypads he redacted many of his diligent works.

There are also two museums within the Centre for Humanistic Studies on the campus' southwest end.  On the top floor, a museum of anthropology and archeology curating and hosting exhibitions of archeological historical artifacts.  But perhaps    
the most precious item in the collection is Ana G. Méndez desk, exhibited in the central room of the first floor.

Puerto Rico Energy Centre (PREC)

The Puerto Rico energy center is dedicated to advancing Puerto Rico's energy efficiency and clean energy use through research, technology transfer, education and demonstration.  Its mission is to contribute to the creation of knowledge in alternative and renewable energy, as well as in energy efficiency practices and technologies, and to promote the use of alternative resources to contribute to the conservation of the environment and the sustainable development of Puerto Rico, the Antilles and the World.

In order to foster graduate and undergraduate research practicums and intercontinental engineering-research-scientific collaboration, the centre leads a consortium of nationwide universities and national laboratories including Sandia, one if not the school of engineering founding father.

History

University of Turabo

University of Turabo (now the Gurabo campus) was established in 1972. In 1974 it earned accreditation from the Middle States Association of Colleges and Schools and the Puerto Rico Higher Education Council.

In 2004, it began the doctoral program in Environmental Sciences and the advent of the Strategic Plan for Scientific Research. Today, enrollment exceeds 15,000 students of which over 450 are doctoral level.

In 2018, the National Science Foundation announced a partnership between the University of Turabo and the Cornell High Energy Synchrotron Source at Cornell University (CHESS).

It offered academic studies from technical certificates to doctorates degrees in seven schools: Engineering, Science and Technology, Health Sciences, Education, Business and Administration, Design and Architecture, and Social Sciences.

Metropolitan University
The Metropolitan University —or Universidad Metropolitana (UMET) in Spanish— is a private, non-profit, and secular university system in Puerto Rico which is now part of the Ana G. Mendez University. It has five campuses:
Aguadilla
Bayamón
Jayuya
San Juan - the main campus and usually referred to as the Metropolitan University itself as it was the first campus and is the largest one.
Comerio

Universidad del Este

Universidad del Este (UNE) was a private non-profit institution of higher education. Founded in 1949 as Puerto Rico Junior College, it grew into a four-year institution in 1992 and finally evolved into a university in 2001. Universidad del Este offered occupational, liberal arts, education, health, science and business programs leading to certificates, associate, bachelor, and master's degree programs in different disciplines. Its main campus was located in Carolina, Puerto Rico. The university also maintained five off-campus sites located in Yauco, Utuado, Cabo Rojo, Manatí and Santa Isabel. In August 2003, Universidad del Este established its first branch campus, Metro Orlando University Center located in Orlando, Florida.

Athletics
The university offers athletic scholarships to outstanding freshman athletes with strong academic potential in swimming, basketball, volleyball, cross country, and others.  It has participated in the Puerto Rico Inter-university Athletics League (LAI) (Spanish: Liga Atlética Interuniversitaria de Puerto Rico) since 1975.

Notable alumni 
In 2013, the United States army noted that graduates of the University of Turabo often become leaders in the US army.
 Alfredo Alejandro Carrión - Puerto Rican politician and the current mayor of Juncos, PR.  Completed a bachelor's degree in business administration at UT.
 Narden Jaime Espinosa -  Puerto Rican politician affiliated with the Popular Democratic Party (PPD).  Completed a bachelor's degree in business management, with a major in marketing, from UT.
 José Luis Caldero - Superintendent of the Puerto Rico police, completed a master's degree in public affairs at UT.
 Eduardo E. Cintrón Suarez - Puerto Rican politician and the current mayor of Guayama, completed a master's degree in business administration at UT.
 Luis Vargas Velásquez - artistic gymnast who participated in '04 Summer Olympics, completed a master's degree in health promotion at UT.
 Pedro Rosselló - Physician and politician who served as the seventh Governor of Puerto Rico from 1993 to 2001. He was president of the New Progressive Party from 1991 to 1999 and 2003 to 2008, and served as senator for the District of Arecibo from 2005 to 2008.  At UT, Rosselló completed his doctorate in education, with a specialization in educational leadership.

References

External links
 

Universities and colleges in Puerto Rico